Daniel Heredia Vidal (born 18 October 1993), known professionally as Rels B, is a Spanish rapper, songwriter and music producer. He is considered one of the great values of the new wave of Spanish hip hop.

Early life 
Born in Palma de Mallorca, the largest city of the Balearic Islands in Spain, Rels B left home to work as a waiter and bricklayer at the age of 15.

Career 
Rels B began his musical career at a young age, but initially dedicated solely to being a producer, although he recorded a couple of songs during that time. After working for several years as a producer, in addition to releasing some singles, he made his official debut with his first EP Change or Die, in 2014.

Other songs such as 'Don't Tell My Mama', 'Word Up', 'Big Plan $', 'Hood Girl' and 'Palm Tree' achieved massive success on networks and millions of views on YouTube. During the same time, the music video for 'Mary Jane', with which he gained wide public acceptance, was produced by Itchy & Buco Sounds and Nibiru Films.

In 2016, he premiered the music videos for 'Skinny Flakkkkkkk' and 'Tienes El Don' on YouTube, with which he managed to capture the attention of other exponents of the genre. His first album Boys Don't Cry was released in the same year, consisting of a total of 12 tracks, again produced by Itchy & Buco Sounds and mastered by Quiroga.

In 2017 he returned with an audiovisual project consisting of various songs with Indigo Jams, such as 'Nueva generación', 'A solas', 'Lord Forgive Me' and 'I Know'. Then he would launch the song 'Libres' and the music video of 'Rock & Roll', with which he had accumulated more than two million views in less than a month.

In 2019, the Majorcan 'spent his time celebrating' and on his birthday he released the album Happy Birthday Flakko.

At the end of 2020, an album titled  was released by Rels B, which has been described as the 'most musical work of his career', consisting of ten songs that deal with confinement, heartbreak and his hometown, Majorca.

Discography 
Studio albums
 Boys Don't Cry (2016)
 Inéditos (2017)
 Vida Play (2018)
 Flakk Daniel's LP (2018)
 Happy Birthday Flakko (2019)
 La Isla LP (2020)
 Smile Bix:) (2022)

EPs
 Change or Die (2014)
 Player Hater (2015)
 Nueva Generación (2017)

Singles
 "Money Maker" (2016)
 "Re-Member" (2016)
 "Lejos De Ti" (2018)
 "Euromillón" (2018)
 "Ballin" (2019)
 "A Mí" (2019)
 "¿Cómo Te Va, Querida?" (feat. , 2019)
 "Shorty Que Te Vaya Bn" (2021)
 "Mi Luz" (2022) No.9 Spain
 "100 Tracks" (2022) No.74 Spain
 "Cómo Dormiste?" (2022) No.8 Spain

References

External links 
 

1993 births
Living people
Singers from the Balearic Islands
Spanish male rappers
Spanish male singer-songwriters
Spanish singer-songwriters
Spanish hip hop musicians
Soul musicians
Urbano musicians
People from Palma de Mallorca
21st-century Spanish singers
21st-century Spanish male singers